The 1994 Nebraska gubernatorial election was held on November 8, 1994. Incumbent Democratic Governor Ben Nelson won a re-election to a second term in a landslide, defeating Republican businessman Gene Spence by 47.4 percentage points and sweeping all but two counties in the state.

Democratic primary

Candidates
Ben Nelson, incumbent Governor of Nebraska
Robb Nimic
Robert Franklin Winingar

Results

Republican primary

Candidates
John DeCamp, former Nebraska State Senator
Alan Jacobsen, roofing company owner
Ralph Knobel, farmer and former Chairman of the Republican Party of Nebraska
Gene Spence, businessman
Mort Sullivan, perennial candidate

Results

General election

Campaign
Though Nelson ultimately did approve of an action to prevent foster children from living with homosexuals or unmarried couples after he was re-elected, Spence hammered the governor for not supporting restrictions on foster homes. Ultimately, four weeks before the elections, many prominent Republicans accused Spence of "throwing in the towel" and essentially conceding defeat to Nelson before any ballots were cast. The divided Republican primary and Gene Spence's inability to unite the party following his plurality victory in the primary eventually led to Nelson's overwhelming re-election.

Results

References

Gubernatorial
1994
Nebraska